A hedge is a line of closely spaced shrubs planted to act as a barrier or boundary.

Hedge or Hedges may also refer to:

Places 
 Hedges, California, a former mining town in Imperial County, California, United States
 Hedging, Somerset, a location in England
 Hedges, Washington, unincorporated community in Benton County, Washington, United States
 The Hedges, a historic building in New York state

People and fictional characters 
 Hedge (surname), a surname (including a list of people and fictional characters)
 Hedges (surname), a surname (including a list of people and fictional characters)
 Hedge Thompson (1780–1828), American politician from New Jersey
 Hedges Eyre Chatterton (1819-1910), Irish politician
 Hedges Worthington-Eyre (1899–1979), British sprinter
 Hedge (character), a fictional character in the Old Kingdom series of novels

Other uses 
 Hedge (finance), an investment made to limit loss
 Hedge fund, a type of investment fund
 Hedge (linguistics), intentionally non-committal or ambiguous sentence fragments
 Maclura pomifera or Osage orange tree, often called a hedge in the United States

See also

 
 
 Edge (disambiguation)
 Henge (disambiguation)